Margaret, Princess of Hesse and by Rhine (born Margaret Campbell Geddes; 18 March 1913 – 26 January 1997) was the wife of Louis, Prince of Hesse and by Rhine, the last prince of the House of Hesse-Darmstadt. Born in Ireland, she became a noted art patron in her adopted homeland of Germany.

Biography
Geddes was born in Dublin, Ireland to a Scottish medical doctor who became professor of anatomy in 1909/13, Auckland Campbell Geddes, a British academic later made Baron Geddes of Rolvenden, and his wife, Isabella Gamble Ross. Her father was a member of David Lloyd George's coalition government during World War I, and later served as Ambassador to the United States.

At the 1936 Winter Olympics in Garmisch-Partenkirchen, Germany, Margaret met Prince Louis of Hesse and by Rhine, the second son of Ernest Louis, last Grand Duke of Hesse. Although she was technically born a commoner, they became engaged the next year. The wedding date was set for 20 November 1937. Planning continued despite the groom's father's death on 9 October.

On 16 November 1937, while travelling to London for the wedding, Prince Louis' mother, Grand Duchess Eleonore, brother, Hereditary Grand Duke Georg Donatus, sister-in-law, Hereditary Grand Duchess Cecilie, nephews, Prince Louis and Prince Alexander, and Georg Donatus' and Cecilie's newborn child, were killed in the Sabena Junkers Ju 52 Ostend crash over Ostend, Belgium. Louis succeeded his brother as head of the formerly grand ducal House of Hesse and by Rhine.

The day after the crash, on 17 November 1937, Margaret and Louis were married at St Peter's Church, Eaton Square. The newlyweds were dressed in mourning and swiftly returned to Darmstadt for the funerals. The couple had no children but adopted Louis' niece, Princess Johanna, after her parents perished in the crash. She died of meningitis in 1939 at the age of 2. 

After their marriage, Margaret and her husband moved to their estate Schloß Wolfsgarten near Frankfurt. Margaret continued to work for the German Red Cross and made Wolfsgarten available as a military hospital during the Second World War. From 1957 she was vice-president of the Red Cross of Hesse and from 1958 a member of the Federal Executive Committee of the German Red Cross for a good two decades. She was also chairwoman of the Alice-Hospital Darmstadt and the Eleonora Children's Clinic (now the Princess Margaret Children's Clinic in Darmstadt). Furthermore she devoted herself to the arts and museums in Darmstadt. She is credited with helping the British royal family reestablish connections with their German relations after World War II. Her sister-in-law Cecilie of Hesse, Princess of Greece and Denmark, who had died in the plane crash, was a sister of Prince Philip, Duke of Edinburgh. The royal couple paid a visit to Margaret (called Peg) and Louis (called Lu) of Hesse at Wolfsgarten on 20 May 1965.

Louis died in 1968; with his death, the House of Hesse-Darmstadt became extinct. Succession and ownership passed to Louis' adopted son Moritz, Landgrave of Hesse, head of the House of Hesse-Kassel.

In 1981, she attended the wedding of Prince Charles and Lady Diana Spencer. Margaret's 70th and 80th birthday celebrations at Wolfsgarten in 1983 and 1993 were attended by the then Prince of Wales. 

She died on 26 January 1997. Her funeral, held on 31 January 1997 at the Stadtkirche Darmstadt, was attended by Queen Anne-Marie of Greece, the Duke of Edinburgh, the Prince of Wales and Prince Philip's sister Princess George William of Hanover.

References

1913 births
1997 deaths
Daughters of barons
Nobility from Dublin (city)
House of Hesse-Darmstadt
British expatriates in Germany
Burials at the Mausoleum for the Grand Ducal House of Hesse, Rosenhöhe (Darmstadt)